The spotted estuary smooth-hound or rig (Mustelus lenticulatus) is a houndshark of the family Triakidae, found on the continental shelves and in estuaries around New Zealand. It is closely related to the gummy shark (Mustelus antarcticus) of Australia. Males can grow up to a length of 125 cm, while females can reach a length of 151 cm.

It is commercially fished, and is commonly served in fish and chip shops in New Zealand under the name "lemonfish".  In June 2018 the New Zealand Department of Conservation classified the spotted estuary smooth-hound as "not threatened" with the qualifier "conservation dependent" under the New Zealand Threat Classification System.

References

spotted estuary smooth-hound
Endemic marine fish of New Zealand
spotted estuary smooth-hound